In Vietnamese culture, five-color flags (Chữ Hán: 旗五色) or five elements flags (Chữ Hán: 旗五行), deity flag (Chữ Hán: 旗神) are traditionally flown during festivals and religious ceremonies. A five-color flag consists of five concentric squares in red, green, yellow, and blue, representing the five elements. The order of colors varies. The outermost square has three ragged edges, similar to fringing. The center of the flag is sometimes defaced to commemorate a specific concept or personality.

Historically, some imperial and military ensigns followed a similar pattern.

Variations

See also
 List of flags of Vietnam

External links
 

Flags of Vietnam